Ursuline Academy is a private, all-girls Roman Catholic high school in Oakland, Missouri It is located in the Roman Catholic Archdiocese of Saint Louis, and was founded in 1848.

Notable alumnae 
 Nicole Galloway (b. 1982): Politician, state auditor of Missouri
 Lillian Gish (1893–1993): stage and film actress
 Laura Sawyer (1885–1970): Silent film actress
 Bridget Walsh Moore (b. 1988): Politician, Missouri State House of Representatives

References

External links
 School Website

Roman Catholic Archdiocese of St. Louis
Roman Catholic secondary schools in St. Louis County, Missouri
Educational institutions established in 1848
Girls' schools in Missouri
1848 establishments in Missouri